Scrobipalpa hannemanni is a moth of the family Gelechiidae. It is found in Croatia (Dalmatia), southern Russia, Mongolia and Central Asia.

The forewings are ochreous-whitish with scattered groups of greyish scales. The hindwings are shining whitish with darker tips.

The larvae feed on Gamanthus gamocarpus.

Subspecies
Scrobipalpa hannemanni hannemanni
Scrobipalpa hannemanni furva Povolný, 1969 (Mongolia)
Scrobipalpa hannemanni gamanthi (Falkovitsh & Bidzilya, 2006) (Uzbekistan)

References

Moths described in 1966
Scrobipalpa